Michael Latham Powell (30 September 1905 – 19 February 1990) was an English filmmaker, best known for his films which were made in partnership with Emeric Pressburger.

Early films
Many of his early films are disparagingly referred to as "quota quickies". Not all of them were really quota films, and the ones that were are often of a much higher standard than most other quota films. Some of his early films are now missing and are believed lost. But those that have survived often show some very sophisticated techniques and early versions of ideas that were reused, done better, in his later films.
Those marked with an * are "Missing, believed lost".

Major films
Aside from some short films, Powell wrote, produced and directed all of his films from 1939 to 1957 with Emeric Pressburger

Television work
Powell also directed episodes of the TV series The Defenders, Espionage and The Nurses.

Non-directorial work
Powell was also involved in the following films in a non-directorial role:

 The Silver Fleet (1943) – Producer
 The End of the River (1947) – Producer
 Aila, pohjolan tytär (a.k.a. Arctic Fury) (1951) – Producer
 Sebastian (1968) – Producer
 Anna Pavlova (1983) – Associate Producer

References

Director filmographies
British filmographies